Sir Thomas Dingley (executed 9 or 10 July 1539) was an English prior of the Knights of St. John of Jerusalem. He is a Catholic martyr.

Biography
Sir Thomas was the son of John Dingley of Boston, Lincolnshire and his wife, Mabel, daughter of Edmund Weston. He was included in a bill of attainder passed under Henry VIII of England; another person on the same bill was Margaret Pole, Countess of Salisbury. He was accused, together with Robert Granceter, merchant, of "going to several foreign princes and persuading them to make war with the King". He had no trial, and no proof of treasonable practices was ever brought against him.  He was found guilty of high treason 28 April 1539, and beheaded on Tower Hill, together with Sir Adrian Fortescue.

There is a discrepancy among the chroniclers as to the date of the execution. Stow gives 10 July, the Gray Friars' "Chronicle" and Wriothesley, 9 July.

The village of Dingli, Malta is probably named after the knight Dingley, who had owned lands in the surrounding area.

Notes

References

Attribution:
 endnote:
For the story of the suppression of the Knights of St. John in England, see Stow, "Chronicle", pp. 579, 580.

1539 deaths
Knights Hospitaller
People from Boston, Lincolnshire
16th-century Roman Catholic martyrs
Executed people from Lincolnshire
Year of birth unknown
People executed under Henry VIII
16th-century English people
English Roman Catholics
Priors
English knights
People executed by Tudor England by decapitation
Christian martyrs executed by decapitation
Venerable martyrs of England and Wales